Javeria Saud (née Jalil) is a Pakistani television actress, producer, singer, and host. She is best known for playing the protagonist Jameela in Geo TV's television drama series Yeh Zindagi Hai (2008–2013). She is married to the film and television actor Saud, with whom she owns the production house JJS Productions since 2006 in the Pakistani entertainment industry. She took a break from acting in 2001, and made a comeback in 2006. In 2016, she co-produced Khuda Aur Muhabbat with Babar Javed.

Career
Javeria entered showbiz industry in 1993 as a Naat reciter. She made her acting debut in 1995 and appeared in various television dramas throughout the 1990s. Some of her notable television shows are Manzilein, Anhoni, Tipu Sultan: The Tiger Lord, Maa, Thori Khushi Thora Ghum, Khaali Aankhein, Harjaaye, Piya Ka Ghar Piyara Lage, Khala Qulsum Ka Kumba, Piyari Shammo, Rishte Mohabbaton Ke, Saharay and Mera Naam Hai Mohabbat.

In 2008, she produced and starred in the television series Yeh Zindagi Hai, which ran for six long years.

Since 2015, she hosts the morning show, Satrangi and Ramadan  transmissions as well.

Personal life 
Javeria has been married to actor Saud since 2005.

Filmography

Television

Web series

References

Year of birth missing (living people)
Living people
21st-century Pakistani actresses
Pakistani television actresses